The Ballarat Football Netball Club is an Australian rules football and netball club. The football squad currently competes in the Ballarat Football League in the Ballarat region of Victoria, Australia.

The Ballarat Football Netball Club was established on 20 May 1860, making it the 3rd oldest continually operating football club in Australia, behind Melbourne FC (May 1859), and Geelong FC (July 1859).

History

Its first President and Captain was Lieutenant Colonel Alexander M. Greenfield. Its senior best and fairest award is named after Alexander Greenfield.

Ballarat played their home matches at City Oval in Ballarat for 88 years, then moved to their current location at Alfredton Recreation Reserve in 1994. Ballarat's senior guernsey is white with Red 'V'.

Ballarat was a provincial member of the Victorian Football Association from 1878 until 1896, taking part in the Association's administration and competing regularly against Melbourne-based VFA clubs. The club was also a founding member of the Ballarat Football Association in 1893. In 1955 the club officially applied to join the VFL. Although the application was referred to a special sub-committee that was to meet and make a recommendation, there is no evidence that the application was ever acted on by the league.

Ballarat Football Netball Club's junior program has produced recent AFL players Drew Petrie, twins Nathan & Mitch Brown, brothers Brad & Matt Crouch and AFLW player Sophie Van De Heuvel.

Club identity

Guernsey 
The senior jumper is white with a red V. The club senior team wore red & white vertical stripes between season 2010 and 2018, however reverted to the traditional red V from season 2019.

From season 2019 the junior 'Swans' division of the club have worn the red and white vertical stripes, and the junior 'Storm' division have worn red and white horizontal hoops. Both junior jumpers have historical significance as being designs worn by Ballarat FC during the 1800s.

Song 
The club song is known as "Cheer, Cheer The Red and The White" and is to the tune of the Victory March, the fight song of the Notre Dame Fighting Irish in South Bend, Indiana, USA. The words are:

 Cheer, cheer the red and the white,
 Honour the name by day and by night,
 Lift that noble banner high,
 Shake down the thunder from the sky.
 Whether the odds be great or small,
 Ballarat will go and win overall,
 While her loyal sons are marching
 Onwards to victory!

Mascot 
The club's mascot is the angry swan.

Home ground 
Since the start of the 1994 season Ballarat have played their home games at the Alfredton Recreation Reserve, in the western suburb of Alfredton. From 1906 to 1993, Ballarat played their home matches at the City Oval, beside Lake Wendouree, where they were co-tenants with Redan. The move to Alfredton was a strategic one based on the growing population of Alfredton and the opportunity to join its junior division, who had been playing at Alfredton since 1984.

Premierships
 Ballarat Football League (19): 1897, 1898, 1908, 1923, 1928, 1930, 1932, 1933, 1940, 1942, 1943, 1944, 1951, 1954, 1955, 1962, 1971, 1988, 2008

Henderson Medal winners
 1950 Frank Pyke
 1972 Peter Merriman
 1974 Brendan Mahar
 1977 Don Discher
 1985 Don Discher
 2014 Shane Hutchinson

Tony Lockett Medal winners

 1927 Dave Duff  113
 1928 Dave Duff  91
 1929 Dave Duff  96
 1930 Harry Cooper  95
 1934 G Anderson  72
 1936 Max Wheeler  108
 1939 Max Wheeler  93
 1957 Robert Brannigan  47
 1972 Greg Brown  72
 1986 Phil Taglaibue  84
 2019 Andrew Hooper 41

VFL/AFL players

Dave Duff - 
Mick Twomey - 
Geoff Tunbridge - Melbourne
David Shaw - 
Percy Beames - 
John Birt - 
Robert Muir - 
Don Discher - St Kilda
Ben Ingleton - St Kilda
Drew Petrie -  / West Coast
Nathan Brown -  / St Kilda
Mitchell Brown - 
Brad Crouch - Adelaide
Matt Crouch - Adelaide
Sophie Van De Heuvel - Geelong (AFLW)

Club records 
Most Senior Games: Paul Nicholls 248

Most Senior Goals: Max Wheeler 359 (1935-1939)

Most Goals in a Game: Max Wheeler 17 (1938)

Most Goals in a Senior Season: D. Duff 113 (1927)

Most Greenfield Trophies (Senior B&F's): Don Discher x 6 (1977, 1985, 1986, 1987, 1990, 1991) Ashley Baker x 6 (2003, 2004, 2005, 2006, 2008, 2012)

Most Years as Coach: Len Templar 15 years (1958-1967, 1970–1972, 1977–1978)

Most Years as Captain: Harry Kaighan 8 years (1921 – 1928)

Most Years as Club President: Matt Glover 21 years (1948 – 1968)

Most Years as Club Secretary: J. Shannon 18 Years (1914 – 1931)

Most Years as Club Treasurer: E. R. Bodycomb 26 years (1897 – 1922)

Bibliography
History of Football in the Ballarat District (2008) by John Stoward -

References

 https://australianfootball.com/clubs/info/ballarat/1852
 John Devaney - Full Points Publications

External links

 

Ballarat Football League clubs
B
1860 establishments in Australia
Australian rules football clubs established in 1860
Former Victorian Football League clubs
Sport in Ballarat
Sports clubs in Australia by league
Australian rules football clubs in Victoria (Australia)